KP Sharma Oli was appointed Prime Minister of Nepal for a third time on 13 May 2021 by President Bidya Devi Bhandari, as a minority prime minister, as none of the opposition parties were able to form a majority government or lay their claim for it in the provided time frame. Citing the provision mentioned in Article 76 (3) of the constitution, Oli, being the leader of the largest party in the House of Representatives, was re-appointed prime minister, requiring him to again prove a majority in the house within 30 days from his appointment. On 22 May 2021, House of Representatives was again dissolved for the second time within 6 months by a cabinet decision followed by approval of President with elections set to be held on 12 and 19 November in two phases.

After Dissolving Parliament 
On 4 June 2021, the cabinet reshuffle took place when Mahantha-Mahato faction of PSP-N joined the government with 8 cabinet ministers and 2 state ministers while other 5 from UML. Bishnu Prasad Paudel, Raghubir Mahasheth and Rajendra Mahato were made Deputy Prime-minister. While the previous expansion was yet to be clarified by the Supreme Court, Oli made yet another reshuffle and included 7 ministers from UML and 1 from PSP-N. On 22 June, Supreme Court delivered a fresh blow to embattled Prime Minister KP Sharma Oli 20 removing recently appointed ministers. It revealed a care-taker prime-minister can't make such change as per article 77(3) of Constitution of Nepal.

Dissolution of Cabinet 
Supreme court ordered President to appoint Sher Bahadur Deuba as the next Prime Minister Of Nepal within 28 hours of the decision made by  Supreme Court citing article 76(5) of the Constitution of Nepal. Similarly, the  dissolution of House of Representatives was disapproved.

References

Cabinet of Nepal
Government of Nepal
2021 disestablishments in Nepal
2021 establishments in Nepal